The women's 80 metres hurdles event at the 1959 Summer Universiade was held at the Stadio Comunale di Torino in Turin on 4 September 1959.

Medalists

Results

Heats

Final

References

Athletics at the 1959 Summer Universiade
1959